Coeur d’Alene High School is a four-year public secondary school in Coeur d'Alene, Idaho, one of two traditional high schools in the Coeur d'Alene School District #271. It serves the northeastern half of the district, with students from the cities of Coeur d'Alene, Dalton Gardens, Hayden, and a portion of unincorporated Kootenai County. The school colors are red, white and blue and the mascot is a Viking.

Demographics
The demographic breakdown of the 1,471 students enrolled for the 2012-2013 school year was:
Male - 53.4%
Female - 46.6% 
Native American/Alaskan - 0.7%
Asian/Pacific islanders - 1.4%
Black - 1.4%
Hispanic - 3.9%
White - 91.4%
Multiracial - 1.2%

In addition, 30.3% of the students were eligible for free or reduced lunch.

Athletics
Coeur d'Alene competes in athletics in IHSAA Class 5A, with the largest schools in the state. It is a member of the 
Inland Empire League (5A) (IEL).

Rivalries
The primary rival of CHS is Lake City, the second high school in the city which opened  in 1994 and draws from the south and west areas of the school district. Other 5A schools in north Idaho include nearby Post Falls (5A since 2006) to the west, and Lewiston,  to the south. All four are members of the Inland Empire League (5A).

 to the south on the Palouse, Moscow was a longtime rival of CDA in the IEL until it dropped to A-2 in 1979 and is now in Class 4A. Sandpoint to the north was a traditional IEL rival, but is also now in 4A.

A long distance from the majority of 5A teams in southern Idaho, the
Greater Spokane League in nearby Spokane County provides a number of large-school opponents for the Vikings.

State titles

Boys
 Football (5): fall 1982, 1985, 2010, 2011, 2013 (official with introduction of A-1 (now 5A) playoffs in fall 1979)
(unofficial poll titles - 0) (poll introduced in 1963, through 1978)
 Cross Country (1): fall 2011  (introduced in 1964)
 Basketball (6): 1928, 1945 (north), 1949, 1963, 1973, 1998
 Wrestling (2): 2010, 2011  (introduced in 1958)
 Golf (5): 1996, 1998, 1999, 2000, 2004  (introduced in 1956)

Girls
 Cross Country (4): fall 1982, 1985, 2004, 2012  (introduced in 1974)
 Soccer (1): fall 2006 (introduced in 2000)
 Volleyball (1): fall 1987  (introduced in 1976)
 Basketball (8): 1984, 1991, 1992, 1994, 2000, 2008, 2009, 2010  (introduced in 1976)
 Softball (5): 1998, 1999, 2006, 2007, 2012  (introduced in 1997)
 Track (1): 1991  (introduced in 1971)

Notable alumni
 John Friesz, NFL quarterback (1990–2000); college football hall of famer
Duane Hagadone, newspaper publisher, urban planner, real estate and land developer
 Don Monson, college basketball head coach at Idaho (1978–83) and Oregon (1983–92)
 Steve Parker, NFL defensive end
Bruce Reed, political advisor, Chief of Staff to U.S. Vice President Joe Biden, President of the DLC

References

External links
 
 Coeur d'Alene School District #271

Public high schools in Idaho
International Baccalaureate schools in Idaho
Schools in Kootenai County, Idaho
Buildings and structures in Coeur d'Alene, Idaho
1903 establishments in Idaho